Röckel is a surname. Notable people with the surname include:

 August Röckel (1814–1876), German composer and conductor, son of Joseph August
 Elisabeth Röckel (1793–1883), German operatic soprano, sister of Joseph August
 Joseph August Röckel (1783–1870), German operatic tenor and opera producer
 Helen Rockel (born 1945), New Zealand artist

Surnames